Welhambridge is a hamlet in the East Riding of Yorkshire, England. It lies around the A614 road bridge over the River Foulness.

It forms part of the civil parish of Holme-on-Spalding-Moor.

References

Villages in the East Riding of Yorkshire